Fantasista is the tenth maxi single by Dragon Ash; released in 2002. Fantasista was one of the official songs of 2002 FIFA World Cup. Incidentally, the song is named after one of the names for a striker in football. It is named after Japanese footballer Shunsuke Nakamura.

In April 2011, the song was certified as a gold download to cellphones by the RIAJ, for legal downloads in excess of 100,000.

Track listing
"Fantasista" – 4:30
"Mob Squad" – 4:04
"Patience" – 4:15

References

2002 singles
Dragon Ash songs
Oricon Weekly number-one singles
Song articles with missing songwriters